Eline de Pool (born 1993) is  a Curaçaoan beauty queen who represented her country at Miss Universe 2013 in Moscow, Russia. Eline de Pool grew up in a family of five in Willemstad, Curaçao.

References

External links

Living people
Miss Universe 2013 contestants
1994 births